Arthur Lee Wilson (October 28, 1920October 31, 2010) was a professional baseball player. He was an all-star for the Birmingham Black Barons of Negro league baseball before playing part of one season in Major League Baseball for the New York Giants in 1951. He was born in Springville, Alabama.  Wilson is recognized as the last player in the Negro leagues to hit .400, having batted .435 (some records say .437) in 1948, albeit in only 28 games played that season.

Negro leagues and Puerto Rico League
Wilson played for the Birmingham Black Barons of the Negro American League from 1942 to 1948, where he was considered the league's best shortstop, and was named the starting shortstop of the league All-Star team seven times from 1944 to 1948 (missing out only in 1945, when he was beaten out by Jackie Robinson, shortly before the latter broke the baseball color line in 1947). During Wilson's time with the Black Barons, the team won the league championship in 1943, 1944 and 1948, advancing to, but never winning, the Negro League World Series.

In the 1948 regular season, Wilson, who was known as an opposite field hitter, batted .437, which resulted in his winning the NAL batting title. Not only was it the last NAL season with a recognized batting title, it also meant that Wilson was the ninth and final player in the Negro league baseball era to win multiple league batting titles. In 1948, Wilson mentored a young Willie Mays, who was just breaking into baseball.

Following the 1948 Negro World Series, Wilson played for the Mayagüez Indians of the Puerto Rican Professional Baseball League, leading them to their first championship title in 1949. Wilson is credited for giving future Puerto Rican comedic actor Shorty Castro his nickname while playing in Mayagüez.

Pacific Coast League
In 1948, the New York Yankees purchased Wilson's contract, and he was assigned to their Newark Bears minor league team; but since his salary would have been less than he was making with Birmingham, he negotiated another contract with the San Diego Padres of the Pacific Coast League. The Yankees protested to baseball commissioner Happy Chandler, who voided Wilson's Padres contract. The Yankees then sold Wilson to the Oakland Oaks of the Pacific Coast League, where he was the team's first black player and the roommate of Billy Martin. With Oakland, Wilson won the PCL batting title with a .348 average and also led in stolen bases with 47. In 1950, he led the PCL in runs with 168 and hits with 264, helping the Oaks to the 1950 PCL championship.

Major leagues
Wilson's accomplishments were noticed by the New York Giants, and he was called up for the 1951 season, where he was used as a utility infielder and as a pinch runner and pinch hitter. But Wilson struggled in the big leagues, hitting only .182 in 22 at bats; when the Giants called up Wilson's former protégé Willie Mays, they sent Wilson back to Oakland, ending his major league career. Back in the PCL, Wilson finished the 1951 season with the Oaks and was sold to the Seattle Rainiers in 1952. Wilson also played with the Portland Beavers and Sacramento Solons of the PCL, winning three more PCL batting titles before leaving baseball in 1957. His career ultimately ended with a short comeback for the Beavers in 1962.

Personal life
Wilson settled in Portland, Oregon, in 1955, and with his wife, Dorothy, raised two children. Following his retirement from baseball, he worked at Gary Worth Lincoln Mercury in Portland for more than 30 years, and stayed on there until the fall of 2008 at the age of 88 still greeting customers. He was named to the Oregon Sports Hall of Fame in 1989, and the PCL Hall of Fame in 2003.

Wilson died in Portland, Oregon on October 31, 2010, three days after celebrating his 90th birthday. He had been suffering from Alzheimer's disease.

References

Further reading

External links
 and Seamheads
Artie Wilson biography from Society for American Baseball Research (SABR)
Artie Wilson at Negro Leagues Baseball Museum

1920 births
2010 deaths
African-American baseball players
Major League Baseball infielders
New York Giants (NL) players
Birmingham Black Barons players
Oakland Oaks (baseball) players
San Diego Padres (minor league) players
Minneapolis Millers (baseball) players
Ottawa Giants players
Seattle Rainiers players
Portland Beavers players
Sacramento Solons players
Tri-City Braves players
Baseball players from Alabama
Caribbean Series managers
Baseball players from Portland, Oregon
People from Springville, Alabama
Neurological disease deaths in Oregon
Deaths from Alzheimer's disease
African-American history in Portland, Oregon
African-American history of Oregon
20th-century African-American sportspeople
21st-century African-American people